M6, M06, M.6, or M-6 may refer to:

Military 

 M6 bayonet, a bayonet for the M14 rifle
 M6 Bomb Truck, a truck used to move bombs during World War II
 M6 Gun Motor Carriage, a United States wheeled Tank Destroyer of the Second World War
 M6 gun, a 3" towed artillery piece
 M6 heavy tank, a World War II heavy tank design that never entered full production
 M6 Linebacker, an anti-aircraft variant of the M2 Bradley infantry fighting vehicle
 M6 mine, a United States metal-cased, circular anti-tank landmine
 M6 Mosegris, Danish designation for C15TA Armoured Truck
 M6 Tractor
 M6-640, a 60 mm mortar used by the British Army
 Hirtenberger M6C-210 Commando, a 60 mm mortar used by various armies
 LWRC M6, a series of United States military carbines based on the M4 carbine

Survival guns 

 M6 Aircrew Survival Weapon, a .22 Hornet over .410 gauge combination gun
 Springfield Armory M6 Scout, a .22 LR over .410 gauge combination gun
 Chiappa M6 Survival Gun, a 12 gauge over .22 LR combination gun

Entertainment 

 Groupe M6, a French media holding company
 M6 (TV channel), a French television channel
 Mike + The Mechanics, the sixth album by Mike & The Mechanics

People 
 Raúl Meza Ontiveros, Mexican suspected drug lord, nicknamed "M6"

Technology 
 M6 (cipher), a block cipher used by Digital Transmission Content Protection
 M6, a British peak programme meter standard used for measuring the volume of audio broadcasts
 Meizu M6 miniPlayer, flash-based portable media player
 M6, a diode electrical component

Transport

Automobiles 

 BMW M6, a high-performance version of the 6 Series automobile.
 BYD M6, an MPV produced by BYD Auto
 M06 or BMW M30, a 1968 2.5 L-2.8 L straight-6 engine
 M6 Presto-Matic, a semi-automatic transmission made by Chrysler
 McLaren M6A, a racing car built by McLaren for the Can-Am series

Aviation 

 Amerijet International (IATA airline designator: M6), a cargo airline based in the United States
 Fokker M.6, a 1916 German two-seat experimental aircraft
 M06, Havre de Grace Seaplane Base FAA LID
 Macchi M.6, a 1917 Italian flying boat fighter prototype
 Miles M.6 Hawcon, a 1930s British experimental monoplane
 M-6 aero-engine 1920 Soviet copy of the  Hispano-Suiza 8Fb V-8 aero engine

Public transport 

 Bucharest Metro Line M6, a planned metro line of the Bucharest Metro
 M6 (New York City bus), a former New York City Bus route in Manhattan
 M6 (Istanbul Metro), a short metro line in Istanbul, Turkey
 M6, a Washington, D.C. Metrobus route
 Sri Lanka Railways M6, a diesel-electric locomotive used in Sri Lanka
 M6 (railcar), a Metro-North Railroad railcar

Roads 

 Frederik Meijer Trail, formerly the M-6 Trail, a bike trail running along the M-6 freeway in the Grand Rapids, Michigan area
 Highway M06 (Ukraine), a road in Ukraine
 M6 motorway, a motorway in Great Britain
 M6 Toll, a toll motorway which relieves traffic on the neighbouring M6
 M-6 (Michigan highway), a state highway in the Grand Rapids, Michigan area
 M6 highway (Russia), another name for the Caspian Highway
 M6 motorway (Hungary), a north–south motorway connecting Budapest to Pécs and Croatia
 M6 motorway (Ireland), a motorway forming part of the N6 Dublin to Galway national primary route
 M6 Road (Zambia), a road in Zambia
 M6 (Cape Town), a Metropolitan Route in Cape Town, South Africa
 M6 (Johannesburg), a Metropolitan Route in Johannesburg, South Africa
 M6 (Pretoria), a Metropolitan Route in Pretoria, South Africa
 M6 (Port Elizabeth), a Metropolitan Route in Port Elizabeth, South Africa
 M6 Motorway (Sydney), a proposed motorway in New South Wales, Australia

Other uses
 Butterfly Cluster, catalogued as Messier 6 or M6, an open star cluster in the constellation Scorpius
 shorthand for king Mohammed VI of Morocco
 M6 ISO metric screw thread
 Mark Sixma, Dutch trance and house producer
 Leica M6, a rangefinder camera once popular among photojournalists
 Canon EOS M6, a mirrorless digital camera
 SureFire M6 Guardian, a flashlight
 M6, a difficulty grade in mixed climbing